The Arzamas explosion, also known as the Arzamas train disaster, was a railway accident that occurred on June 4, 1988 in Arzamas, Gorky Oblast, Soviet Union, when an explosion at a railway crossing killed 91 people and injured 1,500. The Arzamas train disaster occurred exactly a year before the Ufa train disaster, one of the deadliest railway accidents in Soviet and Russian history.

Explosion 
A freight train featuring three goods wagons carrying 118 tons of explosives from Dzerzhinsk to the Kazakh SSR exploded at a railway crossing near the Arzamas-1 train station when hexogen included in the load detonated for unknown reasons, also detonating the other explosives stored in the wagons. The explosion also caused major damage to Arzamas, creating a 26 meter deep crater (85 ft), destroying or damaging 151 buildings including two hospitals, 49 kindergartens, 14 schools and 69 stores, and leaving around 823 families homeless. It destroyed 250 meters of railway track, an electrical substation, some power lines, and damaged the gas pipeline and the railway station.

Investigation 
The officially accepted cause of the explosion is considered to be violation of the rules of loading and transport of explosives. Alternative theories by some, including Governor of Nizhny Novgorod Oblast Gennady Khodyrev, have believed the explosion was planned as a terrorist act or as the actions of foreign special services with the purpose of forcing instability in the Soviet Union.

See also
 Ufa train disaster

References

External links
 Трагедия в Арзамасе volgaflot.com

Explosions in 1988
Railway accidents in 1988
Railway accidents and incidents in Russia
Rail transport in Nizhny Novgorod Oblast
1988 in the Soviet Union
Explosions in Russia
Railway accidents and incidents in the Soviet Union
Accidents and incidents involving Russian Railways
June 1988 events in Europe
Train and rapid transit fires
Fires in the Soviet Union
1988 disasters in the Soviet Union